Lynch mob or Lynch Mob may refer to:

 A crowd involved in a type of extrajudicial killing known as lynching 
 Lynch Mob (band), a rock band
 Lynch Mob (album)

See also
 Da Lench Mob, a rap group
 Lench Mob Records, an independent record label